The women's 25 metre pistol competition at the 2002 Asian Games in Busan, South Korea was held on 4 October at the Changwon International Shooting Range.

Schedule
All times are Korea Standard Time (UTC+09:00)

Records

Results

Qualification

Final

References 

2002 Asian Games Report, Page 672–674
Qualification Results
Final Results

External links
Official website

Women Pistol 25